Vasyl Oleksiyovych Stepanchenko (ukr. Васи́ль Олексі́йович Степа́нченко; March 22, 1914 — September 7, 1995, Kyiv) — Soviet Ukrainian aircraft designer, Hero of Socialist Labor, recipient of 12 state awards, laureate of the State Prize of Ukraine.

Biography 
Vasyl Stepanchenko was born on March 22, 1914, in a large Ukrainian family in the village of Vesele, Kursk Province, Russian Empire (now a village on Russia).

In 1940 he graduated with honors from the Kazan Aviation Institute. After graduating from high school he worked at the Kazan Aircraft Plant, where he worked his way from master to deputy head of production.

In 1949–1954 he was the chief engineer of the Omsk Aircraft Plant, where serial production of the first IL-28 jet bombers was established at that time.

In 1954–1958 he was the general director of the Kyiv Aviation Plant (now the Aviant plant). Under his leadership, the plant was reconstructed, caused by the preparation for a serial production of a new An-24 aircraft.

In 1958–1965 he was the first deputy chairman of the Kyiv Sovnarkhoz.

In 1965 he was appointed the general director of the Kyiv Aircraft Plant, which he ruled until 1979. During this period, the production capacity of the company increased more than fivefold. Among the achievements are: , establishing the serial production of the An-2 aircraft; release of the prototypes of the transport aircraft An-8; preparing the release of An-124 "Ruslan".

He died on September 7, 1995, and was buried in Kyiv at the Baykove Cemetery.

References 

Ukrainian inventors
Ukrainian aerospace engineers
1914 births
1995 deaths
Aircraft designers
Soviet aerospace engineers
Soviet inventors
Heroes of Socialist Labour
Antonov